The Scout and Guide movement in Saint Vincent and the Grenadines is served by two organisations 
 Girl Guides Association of Saint Vincent and the Grenadines, member of the World Association of Girl Guides and Girl Scouts
 The Scout Association of Saint Vincent and the Grenadines, member of the World Organization of the Scout Movement

See also